Hatzohar (an acronym for HaTzionim HaRevizionistim, lit. The Revisionist Zionists), officially Brit HaTzionim HaRevizionistim (lit. Union of Revisionist Zionists) was a Revisionist Zionist organization and political party in Mandatory Palestine and newly independent Israel.

History
Hatzohar was founded by Ze'ev Jabotinsky and others in Paris in April 1925. It followed the establishment of Jabotinsky's revisionist youth movement Betar in 1923. The initial nucleus of the movement consisted of a group of Russian Zionists who had supported Jabotinsky in establishing the Jewish Legion during World War I.

The photo of the First World Conference in Paris in 1925 shows 22 founding members. Aside from Jabotinsky, they included: M. Berchin-Benedictoff, Isidore Frankel, Meir Grossman, A. Ginsbourg, Aron Propes, Jacques Segal, Albert Stara, Ze'ev (Vladimir) Tiomkin, Zinovy Tiomkin, Israel Trivus, and Yehoshua Yeivin.

The name of 'revisionist' stems from the demands by these Zionists for a revision of the Zionist Organization's policies and its leadership under Chaim Weizmann, as well as the elected Jewish leadership in Palestine. They saw these policies as appeasement of British Government decisions in Mandatory Palestine.

The party began publishing Hazit HaAm in 1931, but it was shut down by the British authorities after a few months. They went on to establish HaYarden, and in 1938 the daily HaMashkif. The party had briefly also been associated with Doar HaYom.

Polish members of the organisation were, among other things, instrumental in creating Żydowski Związek Wojskowy, one of two Jewish organisations that organised the Warsaw Ghetto Uprising.

At the time of Israel's independence in 1948, Hatzohar was the largest right-wing organization in the country, and had three seats in the Provisional State Council (held by Herzl Rosenblum, Zvi Segal and Ben-Zion Sternberg). However, the founding of Herut by Menachem Begin in the same year undermined its success. Although some purists alleged that Begin was out to steal Jabotinsky's mantle and refused to defect from the party, under the leadership of Aryeh Altman, Hatzohar won less than 1% of the vote in Israel's first elections and failed to cross the Knesset's electoral threshold. In contrast, Herut won 14 seats with 11.5% of the vote; Altman later joined Herut and was elected to the Knesset on its list in 1951, whilst Begin would carry Revisionist ideology of Likud to electoral victory in 1977.

The party was disbanded prior to the 1951 elections when it merged into Herut.

Leaders

Election results

Gallery

See also
Politics of Israel

References

Jewish Polish history
Zionist political parties in Israel
Defunct political parties in Israel
Political parties in Mandatory Palestine
Political parties established in 1925
1925 establishments in Mandatory Palestine
Revisionist Zionism
Political parties disestablished in 1951
1951 disestablishments in Israel